Naomh Máirtín Cumann Peile Gaelach is a Gaelic football and ladies' Gaelic football club based in Monasterboice, County Louth, Ireland.

History
Naomh Máirtín was founded in 1957 and named after Martin of Tours.

They reached the final of the 2018 Louth Senior Football Championship, losing to Newtown Blues.

Notable players
Michael Fanning
Brendan Reilly
JP Rooney

Honours
Louth Senior Football Championship (2): 2020, 2021
 Louth Intermediate Football Championship (1): 1988
 Louth Junior Football Championship (1): 1980
 Louth Minor Football Championship (2): 2016, 2019

References

External links 
 

Gaelic games clubs in County Louth
Gaelic football clubs in County Louth